Mynydd y Dref (Welsh : "Mountain of the Town") or Conwy Mountain is a hilly area to the west of the town of Conwy, in Wales.  To the north it overlooks the sea of Conwy Bay, and to the south lie the foothills of the Carneddau range of mountains, of which it forms a part.  Mynydd y Dref is the remains of an ancient volcano that erupted about 450 million years ago.

At the summit of Conwy Mountain are the Neolithic Hut Circles and the Iron Age hillfort of Castell Caer Seion (sometimes called Castell Caer Lleion). Castell Caer Seion comprised a stone walled fort, and remains show this to have been an extensive site, incorporated more than 50 hut circles and levelled platform houses, and with a citadel and outposts.

Limited excavations were undertaken in 1951.  No datable remains were found, only slingstones, querns and stone pestles and mortars, which suggests that, unlike many hillforts in north Wales, this site was not reoccupied in the late Roman period.

Millstones were quarried on Conwy Mountain during the Napoleonic wars.

Tracks and footpaths cross Conwy Mountain, and many walks, which can be accessed from Sychnant Pass at its western end.
The route along Conwy Mountain comprises a section of the North Wales Path, a way-marked long-distance walk of some 60 miles which runs close to the North Wales coast between Prestatyn in the east and Bangor in the west.

See also
List of hillforts in Wales
 List of hillforts in Conwy County Borough

References

Mountains and hills of Conwy County Borough
Volcanoes of Wales
Ordovician volcanoes
Conwy
Mountains and hills of Snowdonia